Kokoshkino is an urban locality (an urban-type settlement) in Novomoskovsky Administrative Okrug of the federal city of Moscow, Russia. 

Population: 

Kokoshkino is named after Fyodor Kokoshkin, founder of the Constitutional Democratic Party, who owned a house nearby. The flag of the Kokoshkino settlement is based on the coat of arms of the Kokoshkin family.

References

Urban-type settlements in Moscow (federal city)
Novomoskovsky Administrative Okrug